Acenaphthylene, a polycyclic aromatic hydrocarbon is an ortho- and peri-fused tricyclic hydrocarbon.  The molecule resembles naphthalene with positions 1 and 8 connected by a -CH=CH- unit. It is a yellow solid.  Unlike many polycyclic aromatic hydrocarbons, it has no fluorescence.

Occurrence
Acenaphthylene occurs as about 2% of coal tar.  It is produced industrially by gas phase dehydrogenation of acenaphthene.

Reactions
Hydrogenation gives the more saturated compound acenaphthene. Chemical reduction affords the radical anion sodium or potassium acenaphthalenide, which is used as a strong reductant (E = -2.26 V vs FC).

It functions as a ligand for some organometallic compounds.

Uses
Polymerisation of acenaphthylene with acetylene in the presence of a Lewis acid catalyst gives electrically conductive polymers. Acenaphthylene possesses excellent properties as an antioxidant in cross-linked polyethylene and ethylene-propylene rubber. Thermal trimerization of acenaphthylene leads to decacyclene, which can be further processed to sulfur dyes.

Toxicity 
The no-observed-effect-level of acenaphthylene after repeated 28-day oral administration to both male and female rats was found to be 4 mg/kg/day.

References

Polycyclic aromatic hydrocarbons
Tricyclic compounds